"Chop My Money" is a song by Nigerian duo P-Square. It features additional vocals from Akon and May D. The song originally appeared on their fifth studio album,  The Invasion (2011). P-Square recorded the song shortly after signing a partnership deal with Akon's Konvict Muzik. The music video for "Chop My Money" was directed by Jude Engees Okoye and Ben Marc.

Background and recording
"Chop My Money" loosely translates to Spend My Money. In an interview with Tim Westwood in 2012, the duo were asked about their collaboration with Akon and how it came about. They said they've known Akon for several years and their collaboration with him was an easy transition.

Live performances
On August 26, 2012, P-Square performed "Chop My Money" at the Love AfroBeats Festival, a concert they headlined. The duo also performed the song to a sold out crowd at the HMV Apollo.

Accolades
"Chop My Money" was nominated for Best Pop Single, Best Collabo and Song of the Year at The Headies 2012.

Track listing and covers
Digital download
"Chop My Money" (P-Square, Akon and May D) – 4:32
"Chop My Money" (cover by Henhouse Prowlers, a Chicago bluegrass band)

References

External links
News item and video feat. Peter Okoye of P-Square re:  cover of "Chop My Money" by a Chicago bluegrass band

P-Square songs
2012 singles
Akon songs
2012 songs
Song recordings produced by Fliptyce